"Popstar" is a single by Danish singer Jon Nørgaard, from his second studio album Today Is a Good Day (To Fall in Love). It was released in Denmark as a digital download on 26 August 2005. The song peaked at number 8 on the Danish Singles Chart.

Track listing
Digital download
 "Popstar" - 3:26

Chart performance

Release history

References

2005 singles
Jon Nørgaard songs
2005 songs
Songs written by Remee
Songs written by Robyn